The University of Jhang (UOJ)  (informally Jhang University) is a public university located in Jhang, Punjab, Pakistan. The University of Jhang has been established by the Government, Higher Education Department under the act UNIVERSITY OF JHANG ACT 2010
(XXV OF 2010). A letter was issued by the Higher Education Department (Punjab) to the President of  Pakistan for approval and establishing the University of Jhang with minimum of 200 acres land for this project.

Recognized university
University of Jhang is recognized by the Higher Education Commission of Pakistan.

References 

Public universities in Punjab, Pakistan
Public universities and colleges in Punjab, Pakistan
Educational institutions established in 2017
2017 establishments in Pakistan
Universities and colleges in Jhang District